Charles Mansill (18 September 1859 – 16 August 1945) was a New Zealand cricketer. He played in one first-class match for Wellington in 1882/83.

See also
 List of Wellington representative cricketers

References

External links
 

1859 births
1945 deaths
New Zealand cricketers
Wellington cricketers
Cricketers from Wellington City